Kristin Hallenga (born 11 November 1985) is a Sun columnist and founder of breast cancer awareness charity CoppaFeel!. She received public attention after being profiled in Kris: Dying to Live, a documentary that covered her experience when she had terminal breast cancer. In 2009, she won a Pride of Britain Award. In November 2014, Kris was featured as a special guest on Russell Howard's Good News where she famously threw a dodgeball boob into the comedians face and talked about her charity and experiences. Her memoir, Glittering a Turd, was published in 2021 and became the Sunday Times bestseller.

Breast cancer diagnosis 

Hallenga was diagnosed with breast cancer at the age of 23. Her doctor originally dismissed a tumor on Hallenga’s breast as "hormonal" leading to a late diagnosis. Due to this, she now lives with stage four breast cancer. Despite Hallenga’s cancer having spread to her liver and her bones, and having had a lesion on her brain, she has survived her original prognosis by having terminal cancer for over five years.  Hallenga’s condition is stable, and the cancer has not been progressing since 2018.

CoppaFeel! 

Driven by the difficult experience, Kristin Hallenga and her sister Maren devoted themselves to educating young people about the dangers of late diagnosis of breast cancer. They launched CoppaFeel!, a breast cancer awareness charity, at Beach Break Live in 2009. The charity receives frequent media coverage. In 2017, she stepped aside as CEO of CoppaFeel! – Natalie Haskell took her place in running the charity – to move to Cornwall, and write a memoir.

References

1985 births
Living people
English women journalists
English columnists
The Sun (United Kingdom) people
British women columnists